Park Ah-young (born 7 February 1984) is a South Korean sport shooter who competed in the 2004 Summer Olympics.

References

1984 births
Living people
South Korean female sport shooters
ISSF pistol shooters
Olympic shooters of South Korea
Shooters at the 2004 Summer Olympics